The grey-headed warbler (Basileuterus griseiceps) is a species of bird in the family Parulidae.
It is endemic to Venezuela.

Its natural habitat is subtropical or tropical moist montane forests.
It is threatened by habitat loss.

References

External links
BirdLife Species Factsheet.

grey-headed warbler
Birds of the Venezuelan Coastal Range
Endemic birds of Venezuela
grey-headed warbler
grey-headed warbler
grey-headed warbler
Taxonomy articles created by Polbot